Miss Dorothy is a 1920 Italian silent film directed by Giulio Antamoro and starring Carmen Boni.

Cast
 Carmen Boni 
 Romano Calò
 Lia Formia 
 Diana Karenne

References

Bibliography
 Stewart, John. Italian film: a who's who. McFarland, 1994.

External links

1920 films
1920s Italian-language films
Films directed by Giulio Antamoro
Italian silent feature films
Italian black-and-white films